Pedro Galvão (born 14 June 1934) is an Argentine former swimmer. He competed in two events at the 1952 Summer Olympics.

References

External links

1934 births
Living people
Argentine male swimmers
Olympic swimmers of Argentina
Swimmers at the 1952 Summer Olympics
Swimmers from Buenos Aires
Swimmers at the 1951 Pan American Games
Swimmers at the 1955 Pan American Games
Pan American Games bronze medalists for Argentina
Pan American Games silver medalists for Argentina
Pan American Games medalists in swimming
Medalists at the 1951 Pan American Games
Medalists at the 1955 Pan American Games
20th-century Argentine people